Valentim dos Santos de Loureiro ComM (born 24 December 1938 in Calde, Viseu) is a Portuguese politician, and former football chairman of Boavista F.C. and Portuguese League for Professional Football. He has the rank of Major of the Portuguese Army. He was involved in the Apito Dourado sports scandal, of which he was completely rehabilitated by the Courts of Portugal.

He was mayor of Gondomar municipality in northern Portugal (elected as an independent, as well as of PSD party), President of the Metropolitan Area of Porto and of the Metro of Porto, President of the Portuguese League for Professional Football, chairman of Boavista F.C., and father of his successor, João Loureiro who held the office from 1997 to 2007. He was also a consul of Guinea-Bissau in Porto, leader of the PSD party in the Porto district, and chairman in Porto Metro state-owned mass transit company. Indeed, he is famous in Portugal for the multiplicity of offices he holds at any one time.

Valentim Loureiro briefly attended the Law School of the University of Coimbra before embracing a military career.

Apito Dourado scandal
Valentim Loureiro was investigated by the police and formally accused in the Apito Dourado scandal. In July 2008 he was found guilty of abuse of power but not guilty of corruption and sentenced to three years, two months of suspended jail time. He was rehabilitated afterwards by the Superior Court of Portugal.

References

1938 births
Living people
Portuguese football chairmen and investors
Social Democratic Party (Portugal) politicians
Portuguese military personnel
Mayors of places in Portugal
People from Viseu
Commanders of the Order of Merit (Portugal)